Chamar (or Jatav) is a Dalit community classified as a Scheduled Caste under modern India's system of affirmative action. Historically subject to untouchability, they were traditionally outside the Hindu ritual ranking system of castes known as varna. They are found throughout the Indian subcontinent, mainly in the northern states of India and in Pakistan and Nepal.

History

The Chamars are traditionally associated with leather work. Ramnarayan Rawat posits that the association of the Chamar community with a traditional occupation of tanning was constructed, and that the Chamars were instead historically agriculturists.

The term chamar is used as a pejorative word for dalits in general. It has been described as a casteist slur by the Supreme Court of India and the use of the term to address a person as a violation of the Scheduled Caste and Scheduled Tribe (Prevention of Atrocities) Act, 1989. 

In reference to villages of Rohtas and Bhojpur district of Bihar, prevalence of a practice was revealed, in which it was obligatory for the women of Chamar and Dusadh community to have sexual contacts with their Rajput landlords. In order to keep their men in submissive position, these upper-caste landlords raped these Dalit women, and often implicate the male members of latter's family in false cases, when they refused sexual contacts with them. The other form of oppression which was inflicted on them was disallowing them to walk on the pathways and draw water from the wells, which belonged to Rajputs. The "pinching of breast" by the upper caste landlords and the undignified teasings were also common form of oppression. In the 1970s, the activism of peasant organizations like "Kisan Samiti" is said to have brought an end to these practices and subsequently the dignity was restored to the women of lower castes. The oppression however was not fully stopped as the friction between upper-caste landlords and the tillers continued. There are reports which indicates that the upper-caste landlords often took the help of Police in order to beat the women of Chamar caste and draw them out of their villages on the question of parity in wages.

Movement for upward social mobility 

Between the 1830s and the 1950s, the Chamars in the United Provinces, especially in the Kanpur area, became prosperous as a result of their involvement in the British leather trade.

By the late 19th century, the Chamars began rewriting their caste histories, claiming Kshatriya descent. For example, around 1910, U.B.S. Raghuvanshi published Shri Chanvar Purana from Kanpur, claiming that the Chamars were originally a community of Kshatriya rulers. He claimed to have obtained this information from Chanvar Purana, an ancient Sanskrit-language text purportedly discovered by a sage in a Himalayan cave. According to Raghuvanshi's narrative, the god Vishnu once appeared in form of a Shudra before the community's ancient king Chamunda Rai. The king chastised Vishnu for reciting the Vedas, an act forbidden for a Shudra. The god then revealed his true self, and cursed his lineage to become Chamars, who would be lower in status than the Shudras. When the king apologized, the god declared that the Chamars will get an opportunity to rise again in the Kaliyuga after the appearance of a new sage (whom Raghuvanshi identifies as Ravidas).

A section of Chamars claimed Kshatriya status as Jatavs, tracing their lineage to Krishna, and thus, associating them with the Yadavs. Jatav Veer Mahasabha, an association of Jatav men founded in 1917, published multiple pamphlets making such claims in the first half of the 20th century. The association discriminated against lower-status Chamars, such as the "Guliyas", who did not claim Kshatriya status.

In the first half of the early 20th century, the most influential Chamar leader was Swami Achutanand, who founded the anti-Brahmanical Adi Hindu movement, and portrayed the lower castes as the original inhabitants of India, who had been enslaved by Aryan invaders.

Political rise 

In the 1940s, the Indian National Congress promoted the Chamar politician Jagjivan Ram to counteract the influence of B.R. Ambedkar; however, he remained an aberration in a party dominated by the upper castes. In the second half of the 20th century, the Ambedkarite Republican Party of India (RPI) in Uttar Pradesh remained dominated by Chamars/Jatavs, despite attempts by leaders such as B.P. Maurya to expand its base.

After the decline of the RPI in the 1970s, the Bahujan Samaj Party (BSP) attracted Chamar voter base. It experienced electoral success under the leadership of the Chamar leaders Kanshi Ram and Mayawati; Mayawati who eventually became the Chief Minister of Uttar Pradesh. Other Dalit communities, such as Bhangis, complained of Chamar monopolisation of state benefits such as reservation. Several other Dalit castes, resenting the domination of Dalit politics by Chamars/Jatavs, came under the influence of the Sangh Parivar.

Nevertheless, with the rise of BSP in Uttar Pradesh, a collective solidarity and uniform Dalit identity was framed, which led to coming together of various antagonistic Dalit communities. In the past, Chamar had shared bitter relationship with the Pasis, another Dalit caste. The root cause of this bitter relationship was their roles in feudal society. The Pasis worked as lathail or stick wielders for the "Upper Caste" landlords and the later had compelled them in past to beat Chamars many a times. Under the unification drive of BSP, these rival castes came together for the cause of unity of Dalits under same political umbrella.

Dhusia
Dhusia is a caste in India, sometimes associated with Chamars, Ghusiya, Jhusia or Jatav. They are found in Uttar Pradesh, and elsewhere.

Most of the Dhusia in Punjab and Haryana migrated from Pakistan after partition of India. In Punjab, they are mainly found in Ludhiana, Patiala, Amritsar and Jalandhar cities. They are inspired by B. R. Ambedkar to adopt the surname Rao and Jatav.

Occupations

Chamars who have adopted the weaving profession and abandoned tanning and leathercraft, identify themselves as Julaha Chamar. R. K. Pruthi suggests this is in the hope that they might in future be considered as Julaha by other communities. They believe that leatherwork is "degrading" when compared to weaving.

Chamar Regiment
The 1st Chamar Regiment was an infantry regiment formed by the British during World War II. Officially, it was created on 1 March 1943, as the 27th Battalion 2nd Punjab Regiment. It was converted to the 1st Battalion and later disbanded shortly after World War II ended. The Regiment, with one year of service, received three Military Crosses and three Military Medals It fought in the Battle of Kohima. In 2011, several politicians demanded that it be revived.

Demographics
According to the 2001 census of India, the Chamars comprise around 14 per cent of the population in the state of Uttar Pradesh and 12 percent of that in Punjab.

The 2011 Census of India for Uttar Pradesh combined the Chamar, Dhusia, Jhusia, Jatava Scheduled Caste communities and returned a population of 22,496,047.

Caste reservation
Chamar is classified as a scheduled caste in India. It is largely believed that among the scheduled castes, Chamar benefitted more from the caste reservation system as compared to Valmikis, Bhangis and other Dalit castes due to larger political representation of the group.

Notable people
Jagjivan Ram, former Deputy Prime Minister of India
 Kanshi Ram (1934–2006), founder of Bahujan Samaj Party and mentor of Mayawati Kumari
 Meira Kumar, Former Speaker of the Lok Sabha
 Mayawati, leader of Bahujan Samaj Party and Chief Minister of Uttar Pradesh.
 Mohan Lal Kureel was a British Indian Army officer who served in The Chamar Regiment and later an Indian National Congress politician in the Indian state of Uttar Pradesh.

See also
 Ahirwar
 Hindu Mochi
 Muslim Mochi

References

Bibliography

Further reading

 

Dalit communities
Leatherworking castes
Ethnic groups in Nepal
Ethnic groups in India
Scheduled Castes of Assam
Scheduled Castes of Haryana
Scheduled Castes of Jharkhand
Scheduled Castes of Delhi
Scheduled Castes of Rajasthan
Scheduled Castes of Punjab
Scheduled Castes of Madhya Pradesh
Scheduled Castes of Odisha
Scheduled Castes of Gujarat
Scheduled Castes of Bihar
Scheduled Castes of West Bengal
Scheduled Castes of Andhra Pradesh
Scheduled Castes of Dadra and Nagar Haveli
Scheduled Castes of Himachal Pradesh
Scheduled Castes of Chhattisgarh
Scheduled Castes of Uttar Pradesh
Scheduled Castes of Uttarakhand
Scheduled Castes of Maharashtra
Scheduled Castes of Jammu and Kashmir
Scheduled Castes of Kerala
Scheduled Castes of Mizoram
Scheduled Castes of Meghalaya